Cody Thornton-Miles (born April 5, 1991) is an American hip hop rapper from Austin, Texas. Cody Miles works with Tim Saiza (producer) and Michael Rodgers (vocals).

Biography
Cody Miles is an Austin area rapper who has recorded one studio album as a solo artist and one other as a member of the group Kenosis. He is currently signed to Saiza Inc Records. Cody Miles has performed on several Texas-wide tours and has been featured in publications including the Houston Chronicle, The Williamson County Sun and DaSouth.com. He has opened concerts for other notable hip-hop artists such as Dee-1, Sho Barka, Tedashii, Braille, and Mars Ill. The artist is most noted for his stage presence and positive message. Cody Miles is also known at the local theatre of Georgetown, Texas called City Lights Theatre. He was well loved and appreciated as an employee.

Apocrypha
Apocrypha, the first solo EP from Cody Miles, was produced by Munich Germany producer Mista Min and also featured production from Austin producer Skeliskel. It received recognition on the Houston Chronicle when it was released in April 2012. It received moderate ratings from reviewers.  The album allowed him to open for Beautiful Eulogy in 2012 at Sam Houston State University. The album features the single "Simple Man" with Manchild and has been featured on the City of Georgetown's Facebook.

2012-Present: If We Must Die
If We Must Die the first full-length studio album from Cody Miles, is scheduled for release in mid-2013.  The album is produced by Saiza Inc Records producer Tim Saiza and features samples from Johnny Cash, Michael Jackson, Gloria Gaynor, Barry White, Red Hot Chili Peppers, Paul McCartney and Wings, The Who, Pink Floyd and Metallica. It is reported to feature hip-hop artists Heath McNease, Irrelevant and Manchild.

Discography

References

External links
 

1991 births
American male rappers
Living people
Rappers from Texas
21st-century American rappers
21st-century American male musicians